Freebooter may refer to:

 Marine freebooters, or pirates
 Filibuster (military), an individual who engages in unauthorized warfare against foreign countries
 Rapparee, the Irish usage
 Meadowbrook Freebooters, American polo team
 Freebooter (comics), a fictional character
 Freebooters F.C., a former Irish football team
 A form of copyright infringement